"Cross-Eyed Mary" is a song by the British progressive rock band Jethro Tull from their album Aqualung (1971).

The song is about "Cross-Eyed Mary", a schoolgirl prostitute who prefers the company of "leching greys" over her schoolmates. It was intended as a companion piece to "Aqualung", the opening album track about a homeless man. The Aqualung character is given a cameo in "Cross-Eyed Mary".

"Cross-Eyed Mary" was ranked the 12th best Jethro Tull song in the book Rock - Das Gesamtwerk der größten Rock-Acts im Check.

Recorded appearances
Aqualung (1971)
Repeat – The Best of Jethro Tull – Vol II (1977)
25th Anniversary Box Set (1993)
The Best of Jethro Tull – The Anniversary Collection (1993)

Personnel
Jethro Tull
 Ian Anderson – vocals, acoustic guitar, flute
 Martin Barre – electric guitar
 John Evan – piano, organ, mellotron
 Jeffrey Hammond – bass guitar
 Clive Bunker – drums, percussion

Additional personnel
 Terry Ellis - producer

Iron Maiden version

 Iron Maiden has covered the song, which has been released in different ways (see Piece of Mind, "The Trooper", The First Ten Years and Best of the 'B' Sides). In a 2022 interview with BraveWords, Anderson discussed his thoughts about Maiden's cover, stating, "A spirited rendition by a young Bruce testing out his vocal range in a key not really suited to him!”

In popular culture

Films and TV
 The song made an appearance in the first season of the UK version of Life on Mars.
 The song is featured in the soundtrack of the movie Breaking the Waves.

Music
 The song has been covered by Elf (featuring Ronnie James Dio) in their 1972 live concert.
 The band Clutch covered "Cross-Eyed Mary" for the Sucking the 70s compilation.

References

Jethro Tull (band) songs
Song recordings produced by Ian Anderson
Songs written by Ian Anderson
1971 songs
Iron Maiden songs
Songs about prostitutes